Jamie Scott (born James Christopher Needle; 12 February 1984) is an Ivor Novello Award winning English singer, songwriter and producer.

Career

Songwriting
As a writer and producer Scott has sold over 100 million albums, 50 million singles, has had 11 UK No.1 albums, 4 US Billboard No.1 albums and 3 Number 1 UK singles.

Scott has worked with many artists including Westlife, One Direction, Rag'n'Bone Man, Justin Bieber, Major Lazer, Rudimental, Jess Glynne, David Guetta, Martin Garrix, Jessie Ware, Enrique Iglesias, Little Mix, Christina Perri and Ed Sheeran.

No.1 songs co-written by Scott include "Cold Water" by Major Lazer & Justin Bieber, "These Days" by Rudimental, "Skin" by Rag'n'Bone Man, "Heartbeat" by Enrique Iglesias, & "Too Much to Ask" by Niall Horan.

Scott was the recipient of an Ivor Novello Award for his contribution to "These Days" by Rudimental in 2019, and was nominated for Song Of The Year at the Brit Awards for his production on Tom Grennan's hit Little Bit of Love " in 2022.

Scott is one of the main collaborators of UK boy band One Direction, having co-written their hit singles "Story of My Life", "Drag Me Down", "Night Changes", "You & I", "Midnight Memories", "Home", and "More Than This". With One Direction, Scott achieved 5 No.1 Albums in the US & UK and generated more than 30 million worldwide record sales. Scott is the only collaborator to have worked on every One Direction album, and he played an instrumental role in the bands transition from teen-pop to a more mature, folk-oriented sound. Scott has continued to write with the band members on their solo records, most notably with Niall Horan and Louis Tomlinson. Scott's compositions "This Town", "Too Much to Ask", and "Put a Little Love on Me" by Niall Horan were all released as singles and all achieved Billboard Top10 spots.

Scott was the executive producer of Rag'n'Bone Man's debut album Human, co-writing four songs including the hit single "Skin". The album debuted at No1 on the UK Albums Chart, and became the fastest-selling debut album by a male artist in ten years.

Scott has written and produced music under the pseudonym J.S. Baylin.

Solo music career
According to his website, Scott never listened to popular, contemporary music while growing up. He began his musical career wanting to write music for other artists to perform, but when sending his demo tape to publishers, they would respond that they liked his voice and wanted him to release them himself. Because of this, Scott signed a record deal with Sony Music in 2002, teaming up with producer Toby Smith, keyboardist and songwriter from Jamiroquai, to work on a full-length album. During this time he toured with artists such as Alicia Keys, Amy Winehouse, Ryan Adams, Kelly Clarkson, Gabrielle, Mario Winans, and Ginuwine.

Scott's debut album, Soul Searching, was scheduled to be out in early 2005. However, due to the tumultuous merger of Sony Music & BMG, the release was delayed and ultimately cancelled.

In 2006, Scott featured in the movie, Step Up, playing the character Colin. He performs his song "Made" in the film.

In 2007, Scott signed to Polydor Records under the name Jamie Scott & The Town, and released the album Park Bench Theories the same year. The album was preceded by singles "When Will I See Your Face Again" & "Standing In The Rain".

In 2008, Scott started working with producer TommyD, releasing music under the name Graffiti6. The duo's debut song "Stare Into The Sun" was featured on various TV ad campaigns and appeared on FIFA 12. The pair signed with Capitol Records in the US in 2011, and released their debut album Colours in 2012. Their second album, "The Bridge", was released independently on 21 April 2014.

Scott toured with One Direction on their Where We Are Tour, opening for them on 5 nights, including 3 shows at the Rose Bowl in Pasadena, California.

Scott has released two solo albums through his own record label, Catherine Records: 2015's My Hurricane and 2020's How Still The River.

Scott wrote and features on 2017's "So Far Away" by Martin Garrix & David Guetta, and similarly he features on "Can't Stop The Beat" by Wally Lopez from 2013.

Business 

In 2015, Scott founded publishing & management company Catherine Songs to facilitate up and coming songwriters and artists. Catherine Songs roster includes Mike Needle, Dan Bryer, René Miller, Tom Williams, Michael Hemmings, Tony Burrata, Ross Galt, & River Matthews. Scott is a director of production/record company BSW Music, whose signings include Bow Anderson, Outsider, & Low Lying Sun.

Discography

Awards and nominations 

Grammy Awards

|-
|style="text-align:center;"| 2022 ||style="text-align:left;"|Hero
|| Best Dance/Electronic Recording || Nominated

BRIT Award

|-
|style="text-align:center;"| 2022 ||style="text-align:left;"|Little Bit Of Love
|| Song Of The Year || Nominated

Ivor Novello Award

|-
|style="text-align:center;"| 2019 ||style="text-align:left;"|These Days
|| PRS For Music Award || 

American Music Awards

|-
|style="text-align:center;"| 2013 ||style="text-align:left;"|Take Me Home
|| Rock/Pop Album of the Year || 

Latin Grammy Award

|-
|style="text-align:center;"| 2011 ||style="text-align:left;"|Euphoria
|| Album of the Year ||

Filmography
Actor
Step Up (2006)—as Colin

References

External links
Graffiti6 Official website
Jamie Scott and The Town Official website 

1984 births
English soul singers
English male singer-songwriters
British contemporary R&B singers
Living people
Musicians from Surrey
21st-century English singers
21st-century British male singers